Shumaila Mushtaq (born 23 March 1986) is a Pakistani former cricketer who played as a right-handed batter. In March 2005, she was one of 33 players selected for a training camp by Pakistan's selection committee. She made her Women's One Day International (WODI) debut for Pakistan against India on 20 December 2005, and went on to play three WODIs for the side. In April 2008, she was named in Pakistan's squad for the 2008 Women's Asia Cup, but did not play. She played domestic cricket for Lahore.

References

External links
 
 

1986 births
Living people
Cricketers from Lahore
Pakistani women cricketers
Pakistan women One Day International cricketers
Lahore women cricketers